Rudolf Dworsky (1882–1927) was a German film producer and director of the Silent era. His production company was called Aafa-Film (Althoff-Ambos-Film), Berlin, the co-owner was the producer Gabriel Levy.

Selected filmography

Producer
 Ewige Schönheit (1919)
 The Rose of Stamboul (1919)
 Das Attentat (1921)
 Bigamy (1922)
 The Love Nest (1922)
 Lightning (1925)
 The Schimeck Family (1926)
 The Divorcée (1926)
 Rhenish Girls and Rhenish Wine (1927)
 A Girl of the People (1927)

Director
 William Tell (co-director: Rudolf Walther-Fein, 1923)
 In the Valleys of the Southern Rhine (co-director: Rudolf Walther-Fein, 1925)
 The Fallen (co-director: Rudolf Walther-Fein, 1926)
 Sword and Shield (co-director: Victor Janson, 1926)
 Vienna, How it Cries and Laughs (co-director: Rudolf Walther-Fein, 1926)
 The Divorcée (co-director: Victor Janson, 1926)
 Kissing Is No Sin (co-director: Rudolf Walther-Fein, 1926)
 The Laughing Husband (co-director: Rudolf Walther-Fein, 1926)
 Carnival Magic (co-director: Rudolf Walther-Fein, 1927)
 Rinaldo Rinaldini (co-director: Max Obal, 1927)
 Circle of Lovers (co-director: Rudolf Walther-Fein, 1927)

Bibliography
 Bauche, Freddy. Le cinéma suisse, 1898-1998. L'AGE D'HOMME, 1998.
 Hermanni, Horst O. Von Jean Gabin bis Walter Huston. Books on Demand, 2009.

External links

1882 births
1927 deaths
Film people from Berlin